K2-72d is a small exoplanet orbiting around the red dwarf star K2-72 approximately 227.7 light-years away. K2-72d completes an orbit in 7.8 days, and it has a radius of only 73% of that of the Earth.

References

Exoplanets discovered in 2016
Transiting exoplanets
72

Aquarius (constellation)